Butanediol, also called butylene glycol, may refer to any one of four stable structural isomers:

1,2-Butanediol
1,3-Butanediol
1,4-Butanediol
2,3-Butanediol

Geminal diols
There are also two geminal diols (gem-diols), which are less stable:
1,1-Butanediol, hydrate of butanal
2,2-Butanediol, hydrate of butanone

Isobutylene glycol and methylpropanediol
Isobutylene glycol may be considered a kind of butylene glycol, similarly to butane historically including n-butane and isobutane. The modern name for the closely related type of compounds is methylpropanediol. There are two stable structural isomers:
2-methylpropane-1,2-diol
2-methylpropane-1,3-diol
and one unstable geminal diol:
2-methylpropane-1,1-diol (not a glycol)
These three methylpropanediols are structural isomers of butanediols. They are not chiral.

Examples
2-Methylpropane-1,3-diol derivatives:
Crisnatol, an experimental medication
2-Methyl-2-propyl-1,3-propanediol, medication precursor and active metabolite

See also

 Diol
 Alkanediol
 Hydroxyl-substituted butanes
 Butyl alcohol
 Butanetriol
 Butanetetrol (butanetetraol), including 4-carbon sugar alcohols
Erythritol
Threitol

References

Alkanediols